Mondialement vôtre is a multi-language album released by Dalida in 1982.
This album contains new French single material, plus other language versions of Dalida previous hits and a new Arabic Medley called "Aghani Aghani" that is the biggest hit of the album.

This Medley became a huge hit in the Arab World and shot to number 1 on radio Airplay charts of all Arab countries from Lebanon to Egypt, Jordan, Maghreb, Tunis, Syria and Gulf countries. The Medley is still played heavily in Arab Night Clubs (notably in Lebanon), in weddings, school plays and on Arab Radio stations.

Dalida did a world tour after the release of this album and was on demand in all Arab countries that she toured during this period.

Track listing
 Confidences sur la fréquence
 Si el amor se acaba me voy
 Danza
 The Great Gigi
 Aghani, Aghani
 Pour un homme
 Am Tag, als der Regen kam
 Jouez Bouzouki

Singles
1981 Am Tag, als der Regen kam / Milord / Er war gerarde 18 Jahr' / La vie en rose
Am tag als de regen kam is the biggest hit of Dalida in Germany back in 1959 and since then the song became a classical Oldies song. Dalida recorded 2 new versions of the song, a disco dance version and a new ballad version. Both versions were released in East Germany and heavily promoted on German RDA TV.
1982 Confidences sur la fréquence/Pour un homme
This double sided single was released in France and the rest of French speaking territories to moderate success. Dalida sang "Confidences sur la fréquence" with a little boy called "Antoine" who was a Radio presenter at the time. The song was performed on many TV shows, mostly live.

References
 Dalida Official Website 

Dalida albums
1982 albums